Anaku (Aqsu, Aksu) was a skirt-type garment of indigenous women in the Inca Empire. It was a long drape dress straight in shape, falling to ankle length.

Style 
Anaku was a typical dress of Andean women. It was a long rectangular piece of woven cloth wool fibers, a simple draping garment. The traditional wearing style of Otavalo women was different, as they were wearing it with a blouse. An ankle-length anaku (as an underskirt) was wrapped over with another anku.

Evolution 
The full-body Anaku evolved to half-body Anaku in certain areas. Initially, the anaku was larger, that changed with generations; the length of the garment became shorter and changed to half of the ancestral version. It is still a costume that Otavalo people wore. Anku was tied around the waist with a sash called ''chumbi'' or ''chumpi'' or ''Chumpia''. There was a similar type but ankle-length garment ''aksu'' that was worn in Southern parts. Anaku as a wrap skirt still worn around Northern Ecuador.

See also 

 Uncu, a men's garment of the Inca Empire
 Tocapu, geometrical motifs used by Incas
 Cumbi, a fine luxurious fabric of the Inca Empire

References 

Clothing
Indigenous textile art of the Americas
Dresses
Inca Empire